Gjurgjica, known as Gjergjica or Gjergjicë in Albanian, is a village in Glogovac, central Kosovo. It is located in the geographical region of Drenica.

See also 
 Drenica

Notes

References

External links
 Location

Villages in Drenas